Give Out, Sisters is a 1942 American film starring The Andrews Sisters. The film co-stars Dan Dailey and the teenage couple of the time, Donald O'Connor and Peggy Ryan. Dailey and O'Connor went on to be in the 1954 film There's No Business Like Show Business. The song "Pennsylvania Polka" was introduced by the Andrews Sisters.

Cast

 The Andrews Sisters as Themselves
 Grace McDonald as Gracie Waverly
 Dan Dailey as Bob Edwards 
 Charles Butterworth as Prof. Woof
 Walter Catlett as Gribble
 William Frawley as Harrison
 Donald O'Connor as Don
 Peggy Ryan as Peggy
 Edith Barrett as Agatha Waverly
 Marie Blake as Biandina Waverly
 Fay Helm as Susan Waverly
 Emmett Vogan as Batterman
 Leonard Carey as Jamison - The Waverly Butler
 Richard Davies as Kendall
 Irving Bacon as Dr. Howard
 The Jivin' Jacks and Jills as Dancers
 Leon Belasco as Waiter
 Robert Emmett Keane as Lawyer Peabody
 Lorin Raker as Dr. Bradshaw
 Jason Robards Sr. as Drunk
 Duke York as Louie
 Alphonse Martell as Headwaiter
 Emmett Smith as Porter
 Fred 'Snowflake' Toones as Nightclub Valet

External links
 

1942 films
Films directed by Edward F. Cline
Universal Pictures films
1942 musical comedy films
American musical comedy films
American black-and-white films
1940s English-language films
1940s American films